Seetha is an Indian actress and producer known for her works predominantly in Tamil, Malayalam, Telugu cinema films. She began her acting career in 1985 and was one of the mainstream heroines from 1985. 
She made a comeback to film industry with the 2002 film Maaran.

Personal life
Seetha married actor Parthiban in 1990. The couple divorced in 2001.

She married TV actor Sateesh in 2010. The couple got divorced in 2016.

Film career
Seetha is a film and TV actress and producer. She started acting from 1985 and continued up to 1991. She took a break from acting for sometime and started acting again from 2002. She entered the film industry with the Tamil film Aan Paavam in 1985. She acted mainly in Telugu and Tamil films and also acted in few Malayalam and Kannada films. She acted as a lead actress in earlier days and in supporting roles later in her career.

Filmography

Tamil

Telugu

Malayalam

Kannada

Television

References

External links
 

Tamil actresses
Living people
Year of birth missing (living people)
Actresses in Malayalam cinema
Indian film actresses
Actresses in Tamil cinema
Tamil Nadu State Film Awards winners
Indian women film producers
Actresses in Telugu cinema
Actresses in Kannada cinema
Indian television actresses
Actresses in Malayalam television
20th-century Indian actresses
21st-century Indian actresses
Actresses in Tamil television
Actresses in Telugu television